Limnopoa is a genus of Indian plants in the grass family. The only known species is Limnopoa meeboldii, native to the State of Kerala in southern India.

References

Micrairoideae
Grasses of India
Endemic flora of India (region)
Flora of Kerala
Monotypic Poaceae genera